Allonautilus perforatus also known as the Bali chambered nautilus, is a species of nautilus native to the waters around Bali, Indonesia. It is known only from drifted shells and, as such, is the least studied of the six recognized nautilus species. Thus, not much is known about it outside of the shell.

Habitat and Distribution 
The nautilus is reported to live on the coastal reefs of Baliand Papua New Guinea. They have been reported to live in nearby deep-water habitats as well.

Ultimately little is known about the exact distribution of A. perforatus compared with the more abundant relatives such as A. scrobiculatus. Shells of the nautilus are sold in Balinese market places and tend to be less common. 

Reports from these markers detail that the shells have notable Octopus borings in their chambers. Markings indicate that the nautilus obtained are shells that have drifted onto the shoreline. Likely due to predation by Octopus, the shells are empty upon arrival.

Due to the A. scrobiculatus specimen being isolated in the region of Papua New Guinea, in addition to being close relatives, it is thought that both species of the nautilus are organisms that are isolated geographically.

Commercial use of shells 
Known to be valued in the commercial market as collectibles, nautilus shells and are traded around the world. A. perforatus are traded locally in Bali, Indonesia.  These markets tend to last for a brief period of time before eventually becoming nonfunctional. 

In addition to their trading and commercial value as souvenirs, shells are also owned by museums for collection.

Taxonomy 
Little is known about wild specimens of A. perforatus and this nautilus has mostly been distinguished by shells that have drifted onto land. Thus, not much is known about this particular creature. The genus Allonautilus contains only two species; A.perforatus and A. scrobiculatus. 

Due to its geographically isolated nature, the genus overall tends to be more restricted in distribution than Nautilus

Morphology 
Like other nautilus species, A.perforatus has a coiled shell, shell covering its internal body. The shell has multiple chambers, the outermost chamber being where the nautilus lives. In addition the organism possesses tentacles that form two rings around its mouth.

A. perforatus shows a shell shape and coloration very similar to that of A. scrobiculatus and shares with this species the characteristic open umbilicus. However, it bears highly distinctive shell-ribbing, which is unique among extant ectocochleate cephalopods, and lacks scrobiculate shell sculpture. 

It is not known whether A. perforatus possesses the thick encrusting layer (periostracum) characteristic of A. scrobiculatus. Maximum known shell diameter is around 180 mm. Sexual dimorphism are apparent as females tend to be smaller in size. The shell also possesses a series of plicae (ribs) on the sides of the body chamber neat the organism's aperture. Plicae tend to be 30mm long and its crests 10mm apart, and are explicitly expressed on both the inside and outside of the shell.

References

External links

Nautiluses
Cephalopods described in 1849
Taxa named by Timothy Abbott Conrad